Blue Canyon is an unincorporated community in Whatcom County, in the U.S. state of Washington.

History
A post office called Blue Canyon was established in 1892, and remained in operation until 1905. The community took its name from nearby Blue Canyon Mine which was named by Joe Wardner, a miner in the late 1890s.

References

Unincorporated communities in Whatcom County, Washington
Unincorporated communities in Washington (state)